The 2022–23 EHF European League knockout stage will begin on 21 March with the Last 16 and end on 28 May with the final at the Flens-Arena in Flensburg, Germany, to decide the winners of the 2022–23 EHF European League.

Format
In the Last 16, the 16 teams ranked 1st–4th in the group stage play against each other in two-legged home-and-away matches. The eight winning teams advance to the quarterfinals, for another round of two-legged home-and-away matches. The four quarterfinal winners qualify for the final four tournament at the Flens-Arena in Flensburg, Germany.

Pairings

The pairings for the last 16 and the quarterfinals are based on group stage standings, according to the following bracket. This assures teams from the same group can only play each other again in the final four.

Last 16

The last 16 first legs are scheduled for 21 March 2023, while the second legs follows on 28 March 2023.

|}

Quarterfinals

The quarterfinals first legs are scheduled for 11 April 2023, while the second legs follows on 18 April 2023.

|}

Final four

The final four will be held at the Flens-Arena in Flensburg, Germany on 27 and 28 May 2023.

Bracket

Semifinals

Third place game

Final

Notes

References

External links
 Official website

2022–23 EHF European League